Ad Novas is the name of ancient Roman towns:

 Santa Maria a Vico: town in Italy
 Ad Novas (Morocco): an ancient town likely at Bni Arouss, Morocco

Archaeological sites in Morocco
Roman towns and cities in Mauretania Tingitana
Archaeological sites in Italy